Rhinogobius aporus is a species in the goby subfamily Gobionellinae endemic to China. It was first described as Pseudorhinogobius aporus, but that genus has been brought into synonymy with Rhinogobius.

Distribution and habitat
The type locality of Rhinogobius aporus is a slow-flowing brooklet in the upper Ou River system in Jinyun County, Zhejiang, southeastern China. There are no published records from elsewhere.

Description
Rhinogobius aporus is a bottom-dwelling fish. Adult fish measure  SL. Body is moderately elongated and gray brownish in colour, with 7–8 transverse bands above. Pelvic fins are united to form a round sucking disk.

References

Wu, H.L., K.-T. Shao and C.F. Lai (eds.), 1999. Latin-Chinese dictionary of fishes names. The Sueichan Press, Taiwan. 1028 p. 

aporus
Fish described in 1998
Freshwater fish of China
Endemic fauna of Zhejiang